Brooke Whyte (born 25 February 1995) is an Australian rules footballer who played for the Fremantle Football Club in the AFL Women's competition. Whyte was recruited by Fremantle as an injury replacement player for Tiah Haynes in February 2017. She played every match after her debut game to finish with four matches for the season. She was delisted at the end of the 2017 season.

References

External links 

1995 births
Living people
Fremantle Football Club (AFLW) players
Australian rules footballers from Western Australia